Matthew Lydement (born 15 January 1994) is an Australian weightlifter.

After enduring several injuries playing cricket, rugby union and Australian Rules, Lydement decided to take up weightlifting. He joined the Barbell Club in Brisbane.

At the 2017 Asian Indoor and Martial Arts Games held in Ashgabat, Turkmenistan, he competed in the men's 105kg event.

In 2019, he represented Australia at the Pacific Games and he competed in the men's 109kg event.

Lydement represented Australia at the 2020 Summer Olympics in Tokyo, Japan. He competed in the men's 109kg. He finished outside the top ten. Australia at the 2020 Summer Olympics details his performance in depth.

He is coached by Damon Kelly.

References

External links 
 

Living people
1994 births
Australian male weightlifters
Weightlifters at the 2020 Summer Olympics
Olympic weightlifters of Australia
Sportsmen from Queensland
21st-century Australian people